Fantasick Impossibliss is an EP by The Most Serene Republic released on Home of the Rebels and distributed by Arts & Crafts. It was made available for digital download on May 4, 2010.

Track listing
 "Comeuppance"
 "Pink Noise"
 "Jelly Chamber"
 "The Church of Acorns"
 "Ache of Goon"
 "Fantasick Impossibliss"

References

2010 EPs
The Most Serene Republic albums
Arts & Crafts Productions EPs